The Royal Flight of Oman (RFO) is the VIP air transport capability embedded within the Sultan of Oman's Royal Household.the Royal Flight is a non-military organisation and part of the Diwan of Royal Court Affairs; it is not part of the Royal Guard of Oman.

The RFO was formed in 1974 and started with a few fixed wing aircraft, rotary wing aircraft were added in 1975.

The RFO has its own staff housing and welfare complex (including a club and an international school) on Al Matar Street near Muscat International Airport.

Bases
The RFO has one permanent operating base and a secondary base:

 Muscat International Airport - in a segregated and separately secured VIP terminal and hangar area
 Salalah International Airport - is used regularly and there is a segregated and separately secured VIP terminal supporting RFO activities.

RFO aircraft will also make use of Omani regional airports and RAFO airbases as necessary.

Current inventory
The RFO operates the following aircraft types:

Fixed wing aircraft in the RFO's fleet are normally painted all over white, with a mid-fuselage red and green cheatline. The tail fin carries the national flag of the Sultanate of Oman. The only script painted on the fuselage is in Arabic and the aircraft are named after places in the Sultanate. The RFO's C-130 transport aircraft and its helicopters are painted in a desert camouflage scheme.

See also
 HM Sultan Qaboos bin Said al Said
 Sultan of Oman's Armed Forces
 Airbus
 Gulfstream Aerospace
 Airbus Helicopters
 Lockheed Martin C-130J Super Hercules

References

Aviation in Oman
Air transport of heads of state
Airlines of Oman
Royal vehicles